Mežotne is a town in Latvia 10 km west of Bauska and 40 km south of the capital of Latvia, Riga. It lies in the historical region of Zemgale on the left bank of the Lielupe river near the Lithuanian border.

Mežotne Palace 

An ancient Semigallian castle mound is located near Mežotne. Mežotne Palace was the former Lieven family estate and now serves as the main residence of Freemasonry Grand Lodge of Latvia. Countess, later Princess Dorothea von Lieven, a noblewoman and wife of Prince Christopher Lieven, Russian ambassador to London called "Sibylle of the European Diplomacy" was buried in the family cemetery near the palace.

Dorothea von Medem, Countess of Courland was born there in 1761.

See also 
 People from Mežotne

Sources

External links 

Towns and villages in Latvia
Bauska Municipality